Falāḥ (فلاح) is the Arabic word for salvation (especially from self-improvement), happiness and well-being. In Islamic contexts, according to the Qur'an, actions such as conforming to Allah's commands, establishing the Zakat (charity tax), not taking intoxicants and not gambling all lead to falāḥ.

References

External links 
The Qur'anic Teachings - Falah

See also 
 soteriology

Islamic terminology